The 2022 LIU Sharks football team represented both the LIU Post and LIU Brooklyn campuses of Long Island University as a member of the Northeast Conference (NEC) during the 2022 NCAA Division I FCS football season. The Sharks, led by first-year head coach Ron Cooper, played their home games at Bethpage Federal Credit Union Stadium.

Previous season

The Sharks finished the 2021 season with a record of 2–8, 2–5 NEC play to finish in seventh place.

Schedule

Game Summaries

at Toledo

No. 6 Villanova

at Kent State

Bryant

at Merrimack

Saint Francis (PA)

at Wagner

at Duquesne

Central Connecticut

Stonehill

at Sacred Heart

References

Wagner
LIU Sharks football seasons
LIU Sharks football